"My Happiness" is a song by Australian rock band Powderfinger. It was released via record label Universal Music Australia on 21 August 2000 as the first single from the band's fourth album, Odyssey Number Five. Powderfinger frontman Bernard Fanning wrote the lyrics for "My Happiness" as a reflection on the time the band spent touring to promote their work, and the loneliness that came as a result. It was inspired by his love of gospel and soul music. The rest of the band are co-credited with Fanning for composing the track. Despite its melancholy mood, "My Happiness" is considered by many to be a love song, a suggestion Fanning regards as mystifying.

The single is Powderfinger's most successful; it peaked at number four on the Australian ARIA Singles Chart, number seven on the New Zealand Singles Chart, and number 23 on the US Modern Rock Tracks chart—the first Powderfinger song to do so. In June 2020, the song was certified 5× Platinum in Australia. It won an ARIA Award and an APRA Award and topped the Triple J Hottest 100 in 2000 as well as coming 27th in the Triple J Hottest 100 of All Time in 2009. "My Happiness" was highly praised by critics, with even negative reviews of Odyssey Number Five noting it as a highlight, especially for its catchy chorus. One of the highlights of Powderfinger's United States tour with Coldplay was a performance of "My Happiness" on the Late Show with David Letterman; they were only the fourth Australian act to appear on the show.

In January 2018, as part of Triple M's "Ozzest 100", the 'most Australian' songs of all time, "My Happiness" was ranked number 31.

Production and content 

The lyrics for "My Happiness" were written by Bernard Fanning, Powderfinger's lead singer and songwriter. The rest of the band are co-credited with Fanning for composing the track. The song describes feelings of love and separation; Sains Pennie Dennison said it described "the pining feeling you experience when you spend time away from the one you love". Fanning called it "a sad story of touring and the absence loneliness that comes with it". The extensive time spent touring took its toll on the band, and it was on the back of this that Fanning wrote "My Happiness". Thus, he expressed confusion at its being considered a romantic song.

"My Happiness" was attacked by some fans as being "like Lauryn Hill, bland and boring Top 40 bullshit"; guitarist Ian Haug rebutted by pointing out that the song was an example of the new emotional level on which Powderfinger made music, while Fanning was more aggressive in his defence of the song. In response to being dubbed "Mr Miserable" by The Sun-Heralds Peter Holmes for the lyrics of "My Happiness" and "These Days", Fanning pointed out that the songs could be construed either as melancholy, or as part of "the most hopeful record ... in a long time".

Much of Fanning's writing is inspired by non-rock music, and "My Happiness" is no exception. Gospel and soul music that is "unashamedly about love and how good it makes you feel" was common during the Odyssey Number Five recording sessions. Powderfinger worked hard in those sessions to ensure a more polished work than Internationalist; guitarist Darren Middleton concluded that "My Happiness", "The Metre", and "Up & Down & Back Again" were more "complete" because of the band's efforts. The lighter elements of "My Happiness" in comparison to some of the band's earlier work saw Fanning reveal his passion for several other musicians such as James Taylor—something that "five years ago ... would have been an embarrassing thing to say".

Touring and promotion 
"My Happiness" was put on heavy rotation by Los Angeles radio station KROQ-FM two months prior to its United States release, and Powderfinger signed a contract with United States label Republic as a result of the song's early success. Beat journalist Jayson Argall joked the song had received "a bit" of airplay. Although "My Happiness" was subsequently dropped from KROQ's roster, other radio stations continued to give the song high priority.

"My Happiness" peaked at number 23 on the Hot Modern Rock Tracks, making it the first Powderfinger song to appear on a Billboard chart. According to Susan Groves of WHRL, part of the song's success came about because very few people knew of Powderfinger, but were drawn towards "My Happiness" because it was "melodic, [and] pretty"—a change from what she described as "middle of the road rock" popular in the United States. Meanwhile, Australians were "starting to get sick of My Happiness"—Cameron Adams argued in The Hobart Mercury that this was one of the reasons Powderfinger decided to focus on the offshore market.

Powderfinger performed "My Happiness" live on the Late Show with David Letterman while touring North America with British rock group Coldplay. They were the fourth Australian act (after The Living End, Silverchair, and Nick Cave) to play on the show. The band also did free promotional shows leading up to the release of the single. In Europe, "My Happiness" received approximately four weeks of airplay on German music video program Viva II, and the band sold out for three nights in a row in London, partly due to the success of the single.

Release and commercial success 
"My Happiness" was released as a single in Australia on 21 August 2000. When asked how they chose the release date, Fanning jokingly said "the release date is timed to coincide with the Olympics, when all the visitors are here ... they can go into HMV and pick it up." At the time of the single's release, the band's previous album, Internationalist, was still in the top 50 on the ARIA Albums Chart, 95 weeks after entering. The single featured B-side "My Kind of Scene", which had already received strong airplay due to its appearance on the Mission: Impossible 2 soundtrack. "My Happiness" appeared on a Triple M compilation entitled Triple M's New Stuff, and on a Kerrang! compilation, Kerrang!2 The Album.

"My Happiness" entered the ARIA Singles Chart at number four—making it Powderfinger's highest-charting single in Australia—and spent 24 weeks on the chart. It reached number two on the Queensland singles chart, and peaked at number seven on the New Zealand Singles Chart, on which it spent 23 weeks. In the US, "My Happiness" was serviced to alternative radio on 13 February 2001; it was Powderfinger's first single to chart in the US, reaching number 23 on the Modern Rock Tracks chart.

The song won the "Single of the Year" award at the ARIA Awards of 2001, and the 2001 "Song of the Year" APRA Award. Furthermore, "My Happiness" topped the Triple J Hottest 100 chart in 2000, and appeared on that year's CD release. Rolling Stone Australia named "My Happiness" "Song of the Year" in a reader poll. "My Happiness" was the eighth most-played song on Australian radio in 2001.

Critical reception 

"My Happiness" was critically acclaimed. Cameron Adams of the Herald Sun wrote that "My Happiness" did not disappoint in the trend of excellent first singles from Powderfinger, citing "Pick You Up" and "The Day You Come" as examples. He praised the song's structure, stating that "the verses almost crash into the chorus". Adams also expressed surprise that "My Kind of Scene" was only released as a B-side. The Newcastle Heralds Chad Watson described a mixture of acoustic and electric guitar and "a restrained yet warmly infectious chorus". Despite praising it as a "Big Rock Anthem™", Richard Jinman of The Sydney Morning Herald complained that "My Happiness" was not as "hummable" as past singles "Passenger" or "These Days". Devon Powers of PopMatters described it, and "Waiting for the Sun", as sounding bored. The Evening Mail agreed; it argued the "rock-lite" song, while sounding lush, failed to "make you really sit up and take notice".

Despite being highly critical of Odyssey Number Five, Allmusic's Dean Carlson labelled it, alongside "Odyssey #5", as one of the album's best songs, for the riff Powderfinger executed "better than most bands of their stature". Adams also enjoyed the song's "wobbly guitar", and Sains Christie Eliszer approved of the "acoustic strumalong", but The Advertisers Michael Duffy said the song was "a familiar piece of yearning guitar indie that is polished but pedestrian"; he reserved his praise for "My Kind of Scene", which he described as akin to the best of Internationalist. Darren Bunting wrote in the Hull Daily Mail that "My Happiness" was the best song on Odyssey Number Five, praising "soaring vocals, heartfelt lyrics and chiming guitar". Entertainment Weeklys Marc Weingarten said that on "My Happiness", "Fanning's heavy heart is tattered by scratching and clawing guitars".

Music video 

The music video for "My Happiness" starts at a railway station (Roma Street in Brisbane) with a boy and girl stepping off a train. As the pair leave the train, the boy turns and tries to reach for something, but the girl pulls him back. It is shown that he was reaching for a sentient slinky. The slinky leaves the train, and passes Middleton busking in the train station. The slinky ventures to find the boy, facing a range of challenges along the way; these include avoiding fruit falling on it and riding a skateboard. In the middle of the music clip, the slinky is shown making its way through a music room in which Powderfinger are performing "My Happiness". It rests on the bar and the band finishes playing, while the background music continues. As Powderfinger leaves, the slinky is picked up by Haug. He gets into a car and places the slinky on the car's dashboard, but it falls out the window as the car turns a tight corner. It lands outside the gate of a house and is picked up and brought inside to the boy.

The video was created by Fifty Fifty Films, who created numerous other Powderfinger music videos. It was directed by Chris Applebaum and produced by Keeley Gould of A Band Apart, with editing by Jeff Selis. Cameron Adams of The Courier Mail reported that following the music video's release, slinky sales increased dramatically.

Awards and accolades

Track listings 
Australian CD single
 "My Happiness" – 4:36
 "My Kind of Scene" – 4:37
 "Nature Boy" – 3:12
 "Odyssey #1" (demo) – 4:09

European CD single
 "My Happiness" (edit) – 4:11
 "Nature Boy" – 3:38

Personnel 
Powderfinger
 Bernard Fanning – vocals and tambourine
 Darren Middleton – guitars and backing vocals
 Ian Haug – guitars
 John Collins – bass guitars
 Jon Coghill – drums and percussion

Production
 Nick DiDia – Producer, engineer and mixer
 Matt Voigt – Assistant engineer
 Anton Hagop – Assistant engineer
 Alex Pertout – Percussion
 Stewart Whitmore – Digital editing
 Stephen Marcussen – Mastering
 Anton Hagop – Assistant producer
 Kevin Wilkins – Art direction and photography

Charts

Weekly charts

Year-end charts

Certifications

References 

Powderfinger songs
2000 singles
2000 songs
APRA Award winners
ARIA Award-winning songs
Polydor Records singles
Songs written by Bernard Fanning
Songs written by Jon Coghill
Songs written by John Collins (Australian musician)
Songs written by Ian Haug
Songs written by Darren Middleton
Universal Music Australia singles